Fabio Caponio (born 26 March 1999) is an Italian badminton player. He plays for the Italian national team as well as the Italian Air Force.

Career 
In 2016, he won the Ethiopia International tournament in the men's doubles event. In 2017, he won the Mauritius International tournament in the men's doubles event.

In 2022, Caponio teamed-up with Giovanni Toti won the bronze medal in the men's doubles at the 2022 Mediterranean Games.

Achievements

Mediterranean Games 
Men's doubles

BWF International Challenge/Series (2 titles, 2 runners-up) 
Men's doubles

  BWF International Challenge tournament
  BWF International Series tournament
  BWF Future Series tournament

References

External links 

 

1999 births
Living people
Italian male badminton players
Competitors at the 2022 Mediterranean Games
Mediterranean Games bronze medalists for Italy
Mediterranean Games medalists in badminton